Dar Alai (also Romanized as Dār ‘Alā’ī) is a village in Dorunak Rural District, Zeydun District, Behbahan County, Khuzestan Province, Iran. At the 2006 census, its population was 162, in 32 families.

References 

Populated places in Behbahan County